Sciophila is the scientific name of two genera of organisms and may refer to:

Sciophila (fly), a genus of insects in the family Mycetophilidae
Sciophila, a genus of plants in the family Asparagaceae, currently considered a synonym of Maianthemum